Gnecco is a surname. Notable people with the surname include:

Armando Samper Gnecco (1920–2010), Colombian politician
Jimmy Gnecco (born 1973), American musician
Luis Gnecco (born 1962), Chilean actor
Patricio Samper Gnecco (1930–2006), Colombia architect, urbanist and politician

See also
Gnecco Palace